The Main Building of the U.S. Bureau of Mines is the former main building of the United States Bureau of Mines Central Experiment Station in the Squirrel Hill North neighborhood of Pittsburgh, Pennsylvania. It was built in 1915–17 and dedicated on September 29, 1919. The building was designed by Henry Hornbostel, who was also responsible for several nearby buildings at Carnegie Mellon University. The university purchased the complex from the Bureau of Mines in 1985. The main building, also known as Building A, was renamed Hamburg Hall and is now the headquarters of the Heinz College. It was listed on the National Register of Historic Places in 1974.

References

Beaux-Arts architecture in Pennsylvania
Office buildings in Pittsburgh
Carnegie Mellon University
Government buildings completed in 1919
Government buildings on the National Register of Historic Places in Pennsylvania
Pittsburgh History & Landmarks Foundation Historic Landmarks
Henry Hornbostel buildings
National Register of Historic Places in Pittsburgh
Government buildings in Pittsburgh